Harry Becker (1865–1928) was an English painter, draughtsman and printmaker from East Anglia.

Biography
Harry Becker was born in Colchester, Essex in 1865. He studied at the Antwerp Academy in Belgium, and in the atelier of Carolus-Duran in Paris. He first went to London in 1913. He then moved to Wenhaston and Darsham.

He illustrated Adrian Bell's Suffolk trilogy (Cordoroy, Silver Ley, and The Cherry Tree).

His daughter Margaret Janet Becker wrote the History of Blythburgh and also regarding Wenhaston Church.

References

David Thompson: Harry Becker 1865 - 1928. Wildlife Art Gallery, Lavenham, 2002

1865 births
1928 deaths
People from Colchester
19th-century English painters
English male painters
20th-century English painters
British draughtsmen
English printmakers
20th-century British printmakers
People from Suffolk Coastal (district)
20th-century English male artists
19th-century English male artists